Amor Rourou, born 16 March 1931 in Ksar Hellal, is a Tunisian high official and politician.

Biography

He held numerous positions in the Tunisian senior civil service: head of the geophysical service at the Company for research and exploitation of oils in Tunisia until 1967,  in 1970 he became general deputy director, and then he took the CEO position.

At the same time, he held several positions in the government, Minister of Industry, Mines and Energy from 1979 to 1980.

References 

Alumni of Sadiki College
1931 births
Living people